The Flying Scotsman is an express passenger train service that operates between Edinburgh and London, the capitals respectively of Scotland and England, via the East Coast Main Line. The service began in 1862 as the Special Scotch Express until it was officially adopted in 1924. It is currently operated by the London North Eastern Railway.

History 

The East Coast Main Line over which the Flying Scotsman service runs was built in the 19th century by many small railway companies, but mergers and acquisitions led to only three companies controlling the route; the North British Railway (NBR), the North Eastern Railway (NER) and the Great Northern Railway (GNR). In 1860 the three companies established the East Coast Joint Stock for through services using common vehicles, and it is from this agreement that the Flying Scotsman came about.

Operation
The first Special Scotch Express ran in 1862, with simultaneous departures at 10:00 from the GNR's London King's Cross and the NBR's Edinburgh Waverley. The original journey took  hours, including a half-hour stop at York for lunch. Increasing competition and improvements in railway technology saw this time reduced to  hours by the time of the Race to the North in 1888.

From 1896, the train was modernised, introducing such features as corridors between carriages, heating, and dining cars. As passengers could now take luncheon on the train, the York stop was reduced to 15 minutes, but the end-to-end journey time remained  hours. Like the earlier carriages built for the service, this rolling stock was jointly owned by the three operating companies, and formed part of the pool known as the East Coast Joint Stock.

London and North Eastern Railway
In 1923, the railways of Britain were grouped into the 'Big Four'. As a consequence of this, all three members of the East Coast Joint Stock became part of the newly formed London and North Eastern Railway (LNER).

In 1924, the LNER officially renamed the 10:00 Special Scotch Express linking Edinburgh and London in both directions as Flying Scotsman, its unofficial name since the 1870s. To further publicise the train, a recently built A1 Class locomotive – at first numbered 1472 and, subsequently, 4472 – was named after the service and put on display at the 1924 British Empire Exhibition.

However, subsequent to valve gear modifications, the A1 locomotive's coal consumption was drastically reduced, and it was thus found possible to run the service non-stop with a heavy train on one tender full of coal. Ten locomotives of Classes A1 and A3, which were to be used on the service, were provided with corridor tenders; these avoided engine crew fatigue by enabling a replacement driver and fireman to take over halfway without stopping the train.

During the General Strike on 11 May 1926, the Flying Scotsman was derailed by strikers near Newcastle.

The Flying Scotsman had improved catering and other on-board services—even a barber's shop. With the end of the limited speed agreement in 1932, journey time came down to 7 hours 30 minutes, and by 1938 to 7 hours 20 minutes.

Corridor tenders
The non-stop runs were achieved with a special corridor tender which had an increased coal capacity of nine tons instead of the usual eight. A driver and fireman were able to access the locomotive from the train through a narrow passageway inside the tender tank plus a flexible bellows connection linking it with the leading coach. Further corridor tenders were built at intervals until 1938, and eventually there were 22; at various times, they were coupled to engines of classes A1, A3, A4 and W1, but by the end of 1948, all were running with class A4 locomotives. Use of the corridor tender for changing crews on the move in an A4 loco is shown in the 1953 British Transport Films' Elizabethan Express, the name of another London-to-Edinburgh non-stop train.

British Rail
In the late 1950s British Railways (BR) was committed to dieselisation, and began devising a replacement for the Gresley Pacifics on the East Coast Main Line. On 6 October 1958, haulage of the service by Class 40s commenced. In 1962 Class 55 Deltics took over, becoming a centrepiece of BR advertising, as the steam-hauled one had been for the LNER.

Under BR, the Flying Scotsman ceased to be a non-stop train, calling at Newcastle, York and Peterborough. It also operated at times beyond Edinburgh. On 1 June 1981, the northbound journey was extended to Aberdeen. The southbound journey commenced from Glasgow Queen Street at 09:05 until 4 October 1982 when the name was transferred to the 07:30 from Aberdeen.

Privatisation
The Flying Scotsman name has been maintained by the operators of the InterCity East Coast franchise since the privatisation of British Rail; the former Great North Eastern Railway even subtitled itself The Route of the Flying Scotsman. The Flying Scotsman was operated by GNER from April 1996 until November 2007, then by National Express East Coast until November 2009, East Coast until April 2015, and Virgin Trains East Coast until June 2018. Since then it has been operated by the government-owned London North Eastern Railway.

On 23 May 2011 the Flying Scotsman brand was relaunched for a special daily fast service operated by East Coast departing Edinburgh at 05:40 and reaching London in exactly four hours, calling only at Newcastle, operated by an InterCity 225 Mallard set. 91 class locomotive 91101 and Driving Van Trailer 82205 were turned out in a special maroon livery for the launch of the service. East Coast said bringing back named trains would restore "a touch of glamour and romance". However, for the first time in its history, it ran in one direction only: there is no northbound equivalent service. This schedule is maintained today. Northbound, the fastest timetabled London to Edinburgh service now takes 4 hours 19 minutes. In October 2015, 91101 and 82205 were revinyled in a new Flying Scotsman livery.

The Flying Scotsman is the only passenger service to run non-stop through Darlington and York. LNER's new "Azuma" units (Class 800s and Class 801s) took over the service on 1 August 2019. Since then, this one train is scheduled to run to London in 4 hours exactly.

The Flying Scotswoman 
To celebrate International Women’s Day on 6 March 2020, LNER rebranded the service the Flying Scotswoman for a month. On 6 March 2020 the service was staffed entirely by women, displayed a special International Women's Day livery and hosted a range of women from a variety of organisations in the rail industry as well as from LNER.

Locomotives
As a major link between the capital cities of England and Scotland, the Flying Scotsman was an extremely long and heavy train, especially in the days before road and air transport became common. As such, it has required very powerful locomotives. Locomotives used to haul (and in some cases, specifically designed to haul) the Flying Scotsman have included:
Stirling 4-2-2 'Singles' (GNR 1870)
Ivatt Class C1 (GNR 1897), the first British Atlantics
Gresley A1 and A3 Class Pacifics (LNER 1922), including the locomotive named after the train
Gresley A4 Class Pacifics (LNER 1935), the holder of the steam rail-speed record
British Railways Class 40 (BR 1958)
British Railways Class 55 Deltic (BR 1961)
British Rail InterCity 125 (BR 1976, GNER 1996–2007, NXEC December 2007 – November 2009, EC 2009–2015, VTEC from 2015)
British Rail InterCity 225 (BR 1990, GNER from 1996 until 2007, National Express East Coast from December 2007 until November 2009, East Coast from November 2009 to March 2015, Virgin Trains East Coast from April 2015 to June 2018, and London North Eastern Railway from June 2018 to July 2019)
Classes 800 and 801 Azuma (London North Eastern Railway from 1 August 2019)

References

External links

The official National Railway Museum print website containing many Flying Scotsman prints and posters
, description of the train in the 1930s

Named passenger trains of the London and North Eastern Railway
Named passenger trains of British Rail
East Coast Main Line
Railway services introduced in 1862
1862 establishments in the United Kingdom